Chandana Bauri is an Indian politician from Bharatiya Janata Party. In May 2021, she was elected as the member of the West Bengal Legislative Assembly from Saltora (constituency). She defeated Santosh Kumar Mondal of All India Trinamool Congress by 4,145 votes in 2021 West Bengal Assembly election.

References

21st-century Indian politicians
21st-century Indian women politicians
Bharatiya Janata Party politicians from West Bengal
Living people
Year of birth missing (living people)
West Bengal MLAs 2021–2026
People from Bankura district
Members of the West Bengal Legislative Assembly